The Chaube Jagirs, also known as 'Kalinjar Chaubes', jagir states were a group of five feudatory states of Central India during the period of the British Raj. They were a British protectorate from 1823 to 1947 and belonged to the Bagelkhand Agency. Their last rulers acceded to India in 1948.

History
 Raja Chhatrasal of Panna State, appointed Mandhata Chaube as the killedar of the fort Kalinjar whose father Gangaram Chaube        accompanied Chhatrasal as  his commander when he raised the banner of revolt against the Mughals in Bundelkhand. Mandhata also repel many Mughal attempts to occupy the fort. Once when Kherandesh Khan, the faujdar of Itawa, attacked Kalinjar in 1701. He, however, could not able capture the fort Kalinjar because of Mandhata's stiff resistance. Later Chaube Brahmin officials rose from gentry to nobility. The owners of the first four estates were descendants of Ram Kishan, the former governor of Kalinjar under Raja Hirde Sah of Panna. Ram Kishan Chaube failed the siege of Kalinjar Ali Bahadur I died during the long seize but not successful in his efforts later Chaubes occupied the fort for themselves and Ram Kishan assert Independence.

In 1862 the jagirdars were granted a sanad of adoption. The rule was that when there were no heirs the estate was split between the other members. Initially there were nine principalities but in 1839 two were already extinguished. In 1855 one estate was seized owing to the implication of the ruler in a murder case. Also in 1864 another principality was extinguished and thus only five remained.

The Jagirs were under the Bundelkhand Agency of the Central India Agency until 1896 when they were transferred to the Baghelkhand Agency. In 1931 they were transferred back to the Bundelkhand Agency.

Chaube estates
The estates were:
Bhaisunda
Kamta-Rajaula
Pahra
Paldeo
Taraon

Annexed by the British
Three states were confiscated by the British:

 Purwa with 9 villages and an area of 53.18 km2 (annexed in 1855)
 Nayagaon with 18 villages and an area of 65.11 km2 (annexed in 1864).

See also
Panna State
Vindhya Pradesh

References

Princely states of Bundelkhand
Jagirs
Princely states of Madhya Pradesh
Satna district